Moonchild (stylized as MOONCHILD) is the debut studio album by Indonesian singer-songwriter Niki. It was released on 10 September 2020 by 88rising and 12Tone Music.

Background
This album was composed over the course of two years. It has been described as a concept album. The album is divided into three parts. According to a press release from 12Tone Music, these three parts represent three lunar phases of self-exploration: crescent moon (innocence, curiosity, embarking); half-moon/eclipse (loss of hope, disillusionment); and the full moon (self-discovery, strength).

Speaking on the title of the album, Zefanya stated in an interview with Hypebae

Release and promotion
The album was originally scheduled to be released in late 2019, but was pushed back a year later on 10 September 2020. The album's first single, "Switchblade" was released on 2 April 2020. The album's second single, "Selene" was released on 16 July 2020. The third and final single from the album, "Lose" was released on 13 August 2020.

On 10 October 2020, Zefanya held a virtual livestream concert titled the Moonchild Experience. It was streamed on YouTube for global audiences and KASKUS TV for Indonesian viewers.

In January 2021, Zefanya collaborated with clothing brand Guess, releasing clothing inspired by the album.

Track listing
Credits adapted from Spotify.

References

Niki (singer) albums
2020 debut albums
88rising albums